Rubini is a surname of Italian origin. Notable people with the surname include:

 Cesare Rubini, Italian basketball player
 Gabriele Rubini, Italian television presenter
 Giambattista Rubini, Italian Catholic cardinal 
 Giovanni Battista Rubini, Italian tenor
 Giulia Rubini, Italian actress
 Michel Rubini, American musician and composer
 Olinto Sampaio Rubini, Brazilian footballer
 Sergio Rubini, Italian actor and film director

See also
 Rupini
 Nouriel Roubini